Edward John Michell (15 June 1853 – 5 May 1900) was an English first-class cricketer. Michell was a right-handed batsman.

Michell represented Hampshire in a single first-class match in 1880 against the Marylebone Cricket Club, where he scored seven runs.

Michell died in New Zealand on 5 May 1900.

Family
Michell's brother Charles Michell represented the Gentlemen of Marylebone Cricket Club in a single first-class match.

External links
Edward Michell at Cricinfo
Edward Michell at CricketArchive

1853 births
1900 deaths
People from Steyning
English cricketers
Hampshire cricketers